Maciej Kot (born 9 June 1991) is a Polish ski jumper. He is a member of the national team and competed at the Winter Olympics in 2014 and 2018. He is a 2017 World Champion and bronze medalist of 2013 World Championship in the team large hill event.

Personal life
Maciej Kot was born in Limanowa, Poland, but raised in Zakopane. His father Rafał was a physiotherapist for the Polish ski jumping team, now he is a ski jumping expert for Polish national television. Maciej's older brother Jakub (born 1990) is a ski jumper as well. Maciej Kot graduated the University School of Physical Education in Krakow with master's degree in physical education (MPhEd). Maciej is dating Agnieszka Lewkowicz, personal trainer and former athlete. They met at university. On 18 May 2019 he married Agnieszka Lewkowicz. His surname means 'cat' in Polish.

Career
Kot's debut in FIS Ski Jumping World Cup took place in December 2007 in Villach.  The 2011/2012 World Cup season marked first time he scored points on the tour. On December 3, 2011 took 19th place on the hill in Lillehammer. Finally made it twelve times that winter, his best score was 12th place (twice) in Lahti on March 4 and March 11 in Oslo. In the overall World Cup was on 35 position, which was the third best record among the Poles. On March 15, 2012 at Letalnica in Planica set his personal record in the length of the stroke – 200.5 meter.

2012/2013
On July 21, 2012 during the Summer Grand Prix competition in Wisla to jump them. Maciej Kot stood on the podium first time in occupations that rank alongside Simon Ammann and Wolfgang Loitzl. On September 30, 2012 in Hinzenbach again was the winner of the competition Summer Grand Prix, ahead of the second Severin Freund and third Taku Takeuchi. In the 2012 season the Summer Grand Prix finally came in fifth place. On January 1, 2013 in New Year competition 61st Four Hills Tournament in Garmisch-Partenkirchen was 5th. In two consecutive contests also take up space in the top ten. Finally, in the overall tournament he was, thanks to a weak performance in the competition in Oberstdorf, on the 20th position.

In individual competitions at FIS Nordic World Ski Championships 2013 took 11th place on the normal hill and 27th on the large hill. On March 2, 2013 he won there a bronze medal in team competition with teammates: Kamil Stoch, Dawid Kubacki, Piotr Żyła. The primary outcome of the competition his team took fourth place, but after re-counting the scores because of Thomas Morgenstern, who noticed a mistake in the points and at the request of the Germans, they finished in third place (Norway was in front of the Polish, but Bardal's jump was badly counted).

Season 2012/2013 was the best in his career so far. He was in top 10 seven times. The season ended on the 18th place in the overall World Cup. At the end of the season he won the title of team and individual Polish champion in ski jumping in Wisła, Poland.

2016/2017
In 2016 FIS Ski Jumping Grand Prix Kot won 5 of 10 competitions. He hold yellow bib for entire season and won overall.

On December 3, 2016 Polish national team including Żyła, Stoch, Kubacki and Kot won first competition in team for Poland in history. In Zakopane Polish team, including Stoch, Kubacki, Kot, Żyła achieved second place in team competition. On January 28, 2017 Poland won their second team competition in history in Willingen. Maciej made his first victory of FIS Ski Jumping World Cup in career on February 11, 2017. He won ex aequo with Peter Prevc, both achieved 260.2 points. Next day, he took fourth place.

On March 4, 2017 Polish national team, including Żyła, Kubacki, Kot and Stoch, achieved first in history title of 2017 World Champions in team event. They beat Norway and Austria at Salpausselkä K116 in Lahti, Finland.

2017/2018
On February 19, 2018 Kot and his teammates Stefan Hula, Dawid Kubacki and Kamil Stoch achieved first medal in Olympic team competition for Poland. They claimed a bronze behind Norway and Germany.

Olympic Games

World Championships

Ski Flying World Championships

World Cup

Season standings

Individual starts

Victories

Podiums

Team victories

References

External links

1991 births
Living people
Polish male ski jumpers
People from Limanowa
Sportspeople from Lesser Poland Voivodeship
FIS Nordic World Ski Championships medalists in ski jumping
Olympic ski jumpers of Poland
Ski jumpers at the 2014 Winter Olympics
Universiade medalists in ski jumping
Ski jumpers at the 2018 Winter Olympics
Olympic bronze medalists for Poland
Olympic medalists in ski jumping
Medalists at the 2018 Winter Olympics
Universiade silver medalists for Poland
Universiade bronze medalists for Poland
Competitors at the 2011 Winter Universiade
21st-century Polish people